The Slovenia Men's Under-19 National Floorball Team is the men's under-19 national floorball team of the Slovenia, and a member of the International Floorball Federation. The team is composed of the best Slovenian floorball players under the age of 19. The Slovenian under-19 men's team is currently ranked 10th in the world at floorball, and played in the B-Division at the most recent U-19 World Floorball Championships.

The team is currently prepping for the 2021 U-19 World Floorball Championship.

Roster 
As of June 27, 2019

Team Staff 
Head Coach - Gorazd Tomc 

Coach - Nejc Šega 

Coach - Janez Šubic 

Coach - Anže Šneberger 

Team Official - Andraz Podrzaj 

Physiotherapist - Estera Vehar

Records

All-Time World Championship Records

Head-to-Head International Records

References 

Sport in Slovenia
Floorball